Color Me Obsessed is a 2011 American documentary film directed, edited and co-produced by Gorman Bechard about the alternative rock band the Replacements.

Plot
Unlike traditional music documentaries; Color Me Obsessed features no licensed music or live footage, instead featuring interviews with fans of the band telling the story of the Replacements. Included in the documentary are interviews with members of Hüsker Dü, the Goo Goo Dolls, the Hold Steady, the Decemberists, the Gaslight Anthem, Babes in Toyland, as well as average fans who simply enjoy the band.

Release
The film is distributed by MVD Entertainment, and was released on DVD in November 2012. The film has been screened at the following festivals:

 Tampa, Florida - Gasparilla International Film Festival, March 26, 2011
 Madison, Wisconsin - Wisconsin Film Festival, March 5, 2011
 Chicago, Illinois - CIMMfest 2011, April 15, 2011
 Boston, Massachusetts - Independent Film Festival Boston, April 28, 2011
 Minneapolis, Minnesota - Sound Unseen Festival, May 4 & 5, 2011
 Duluth, Minnesota - Sound Unseen International Duluth Film & Music Festival, June 11, 2011
 Toronto, Ontario, Canada - NXNE Festival and Conference, June 17
 Calgary, Alberta, Canada - Sled Island Music and Arts Festival, June 21, 2011
 San Francisco, California - Frozen Film Festival, July 9, 2011
 Boulder, Colorado - DocuWest, September 2011
 Philadelphia, Pennsylvania - Philly Film & Music Festival, September 24, 2011
 Bay City, Michigan - Hell's Half Mile, September 30, 2011
 Seattle, Washington - Northwest Film Festival, October 21, 22, and 23, 2011
 Los Angeles, California - Downtown Independent, November 3 and 4, 2011
 New Orleans, Louisiana - Zeitgeist Cinema, January 20 and 21, 2012
 Albuquerque, New Mexico - Guild Cinema, January 26 through February 1, 2012
 Washington, DC - Black Cat Bar, March 9, 2012
 Melbourne, Australia - Gerschwin Room, March 29, 2012
 Stockholm, Sweden - Bio Rio, April 12, 201
 Atlanta, Georgia - The Earl Bar, April 12, 2012
 Providence, Rhode Island - Cable Car Cinema, April 21, 2012
 Austin, Texas - Alamo Drafthouse, April 30, 2012
 Columbus, Ohio -  Reelin' & Rockin' at Gateway Film Center, October 17, 2012
 Cleveland, Ohio -  Rock and Roll Hall of Fame and Museum, December 12, 2012

Reception
David Browne of Rolling Stone called the film one of "the seven best new music documentaries of the year." Dan Schoenbrun of Filmmaker wrote: "Gorman Bechard's Color Me Obsessed is the rare music documentary that lavishes admiration not only onto its subject, rowdy Minneapolis cult rock band The Replacements, but on the band's fans as well." Peter Gerstenzang of The Village Voice called the film "pretty original", writing: "With so many voices, Color Me becomes a rock version of Rashomon, and what the film lacks in music and live footage, it more than makes up for with obsessive detail and heated debate."

References

External links
 
 

Documentary films about rock music and musicians
Films directed by Gorman Bechard
2010s English-language films